The 2013–14 Idaho Vandals men's basketball team represented the University of Idaho during the 2013–14 NCAA Division I men's basketball season. The Vandals, led by sixth year head coach Don Verlin, played their home games at the Cowan Spectrum, with a few early season games at Memorial Gym, and were members of the Western Athletic Conference. They finished the season 16–18, 7–9 in WAC play to finish in a tie for fifth place. They advanced to the championship game of the WAC tournament where they lost to New Mexico State.

This was Idaho's final season in the WAC as they will join the Big Sky Conference for the 2014–15 season.

Roster

Schedule

|-
!colspan=9 style="background:#B18E5F; color:#000000;"| Exhibition

|-
!colspan=9 style="background:#B18E5F; color:#000000;"| Regular season

|-
!colspan=9 style="background:#B18E5F; color:#000000;"| WAC Tournament

References

Idaho
Idaho Vandals men's basketball seasons
Idaho
Idaho